Charles Wylie may refer to:

 Charles Wylie (astronomer) (1886–1976), American astronomer
 Charles Wylie (British Army officer) (1919–2007), British army officer and mountaineer

See also 
 Charles Doughty-Wylie (1868–1915), English recipient of the Victoria Cross